Campfire on the Road is the thirty-second album by American singer-songwriter Michael Martin Murphey, his second solo performance album, and his fourth live album. The album was recorded live February 28 and March 1, 2011 at the Western Jubilee Warehouse Theater in Colorado Springs, Colorado, and was released February 21, 2012.

Track listing
 "Intro" – 0:22
 "Campfire on the Road" (Williamson) – 4:52
 "Boy from the Country" (Murphey, Castleman) – 4:19
 "Lost River" (Murphey) – 3:33
 "Crystal" (Murphey) – 5:13
 "Texas Morning" (Murphey, Castleman) – 4:00
 "West Texas Highway" (Murphey, Castleman) – 3:11
 "Spanish is the Loving Tongue" (Clark) – 6:04
 "Old Chisholm Trial" – 8:11
 "Geronimo's Cadillac" (Murphey) – 3:56
 "Red River Valley" / "Campfire Reprise" – 5:58

Credits
Music
 Michael Martin Murphey - vocals, guitar, photography

Production
 Nick Abbott – concert producer
 Charles Belden – cover photo
 Kathleen Fox Collins – project coordinator
 Butch Hause – engineer, mastering, mixing, producer
 Inaiah Lujan – design
 Annie McFadin – concert producer
 Scott O'Malley – producer
 Tyler O'Malley – concert producer
 David Olsen – project coordinator
 Brendan O'Malley – concert producer
 Joe Ownbey – photography
 Donna Phillips – project coordinator

References

External links
 Michael Martin Murphey's Official Website
 Western Jubilee Recording Company

2012 live albums
Michael Martin Murphey albums